Manhattan Nocturne is a crime novel by Colin Harrison set in Manhattan, first published in 1996.  The novel was published in America in hardcover by Crown and remains in print by Picador in trade paperback. Fifteen foreign, paperback, and bookclub editions were published and the book was selected a New York Times Notable Book.

Plot 
Porter Wren is a columnist and crime reporter for a New York City newspaper. He is a popular journalist and his stories are widely read. Wren knows how to listen to people and there are people who just need to talk, especially to him. He attends an after-work party hosted by the publishing magnate, where he meets Caroline Crowley.

Mrs. Crowley was recently widowed by the mysterious murder of her husband Simon Crowley. Crowley was a brilliant movie director who would often just disappear at night to videotape stuff. Crowley's body was discovered in a sealed-off building that was about to be demolished. No one could figure out how the body got there.

Caroline invites him to her apartment where she shows him confidential police reports related to the death of her husband. She wants Porter to investigate the murder and as an incentive seduces him even though he is married with children. What follows is a twisted tale of sex, murder and blackmail.

Film

A movie version retitled Manhattan Night was filmed in New York in late 2014, directed by Brian DeCubellis and starring Adrien Brody, Yvonne Strahovski, Campbell Scott and Jennifer Beals. On May 20, 2016 the film was released worldwide by Lionsgate Premiere.

References

External links
 Review at EW.com

1996 American novels
American crime novels
Novels set in Manhattan
American novels adapted into films